is a Japanese superhero kaiju film, serving as the conclusion to the 2021-22 Ultra Series television series Ultraman Trigger: New Generation Tiga. Aside from its premiere on March 18, 2022, through Japanese theaters, it will also be made available on the pay per view website Tsuburaya Imagination.

Synopsis

Two years after Kengo merged into the Eternity Core as Ultraman Trigger to stabilize it, GUTS-Select and their new leader Ryuichi Tokioka deal with a new wave of monster attacks before being assigned to investigate the Leyrah cult, a terrorist group seeking to restore the Ultra Ancient Civilization. The group learn from the cult's captured leader, Leyrah Ibra, relays his message of the Eternity Core and Kengo's impending doom to Yuna, and that to save them both require the help of Yuzare and the Ancient Sparklence. GUTS-Select agrees with the temporary alliance to enact a ritual to extract Kengo from the Eternity Core, with Kengo's Hyper Keys scattered in the process. Following a brief celebration, Ibra escapes while using a Pagos to attack TPU headquarters as a diversion. The monster is quickly defeated by Ultraman Z, revealing he and Haruki were on the tracking down the alien parasite Celebro after it escaped from STORAGE’s captivity. As Haruki and Z's search led them to Kengo’s Earth, the group deduce that Celebro is hiding amongst the Leyrah cultists and decide to track the cult down while locating Trigger's Hyper Keys.

During their hunt for the keys, Celebro and Ibra summons a Gazort before luring Haruki away after he gives Kengo the Multi Type key for Kengo, Trigger regaining the Sky Type and Power Type keys while joined by Z to destroy Deathdrago and Genegarg in a wrestling match. But Haruki is revealed to have been possessed by Celebro, who reveals himself while turning Ultraman Z into Z Red Damage before seemingly killing off Tokioka while stealing the Hyper Keys. Ignis arrives at that moment to spirit GUTS-Select away from the cult. The group reassembles and confront Leyrah cultists as they prepare another ritual with their true leader revealed to be Tokioka, who reveals himself as Yuzare's comrade Zabil. Zabil explains that he realized from witnessing Yuzare's death that humans must become "light" to protect themselves, having orchestrated events in anticipation of the Giants of Darkness' return to steal Trigger's light while forming an alliance with Celebro by promising the parasite that it would resume its Civilization Self-Destruction Game. With Trigger's Hyper Keys as conduits, Zabil sacrifices his followers to activate his Ancient Sparklence and transform into Evil Trigger, who proceeds to overpower Trigger Dark and GUTS-Select's mechas with Z Red Damage.

After Akito reclaims his gear to become Trigger again while Tatsumi resumes command of GUTS-Select, Kengo helps Haruki expel Celebro with Z back to normal. Celebros retaliates by possessing Ibra and turning its host into Destrudos, helping Evil Trigger overpower the Ultramen. As GUTS-Select defend Kengo as their friend when Evil Trigger mocks him for not being a human, Yuna sacrifices Yuzare's ring and the gateway tower to have the Eternity Core restore Trigger's ability to become Glitter Trigger Eternity. After Destrudos is defeated by the Ultramen, Evil Trigger attempts to kill them after using his inner darkness to increase his size. But he is fatally wounded, reverting to Zabil as he dissolves with the gateway tower. Himari gives the recaptured Celebro to Haruki, who returns to his Earth while Ignis resumes his journey for treasure. The entire GUTS-Select later celebrates their victory, while Kengo decides to continue living as both human and Ultraman. 

The movie then ends with a post-credit scene that teases the new Ultraman, Decker.

Production
Ultraman Trigger: Episode Z is first announced by Tsuburaya Productions in the second Tsubucon stage announcement on December 13, 2021. The stage greeting presents the actors Raiga Terasaka, Kohshu Hirano and Yūichi Nakamura introducing themselves to the audience with Evil Trigger making his brief glimpse of appearance. Kohshu Hirano noted that since the series Ultraman Z lacks a movie adaptation, he had hopes to leave his mark for the franchise through his guest appearance. Actor Yūichi Nakamura acknowledges that the voice actor who shares his name was the voice of the eponymous Ultraman X and jokingly commented that he was "mistakenly" picked by the series for this role.

Releases
In addition to the film's availability in Japanese theaters, it is also available for viewing in Tsuburaya Imagination, a pay per view subscription service exclusively in Japan, hence the film's label as a "Tsuburaya Imagination original film". Tsuburaya's English website later announces the movie's availability in certain countries outside Japan as a video on demand through Ultraman Connection website, followed by a talk show between the cast members, Raiga Terasaka, Runa Toyoda, Shunya Kaneko and Kohshu Hirano. In addition to English, subtitles in other languages include Thai, Indonesian, Malaysian, Brazilian Portuguese, South American Spanish, Vietnamese, Tagalog and Korean.

Cast
/: 
: 
: 
: 
: 
: 
/: 
: 
: 
/: 
: 
: M・A・O
: 
:

Theme song
Believer
Lyrics: 
Composition: 
Arrangement:  × 
Artist: Kengo Manaka, Yuna Shizuma, & Akito Hijiri (Raiga Terasaka, Runa Toyoda, & Shunya Kaneko)

International broadcast
In Hong Kong, this film aired on ViuTV from September 24 to October 1, 2022 splitting into three parts.

References

2022 films
2020s Japanese-language films
Ultra Series films